Girlfriend was an Australian girl group formed in 1991. Their debut album Make It Come True was released in 1992 and contained four ARIA top 50 singles, including the #1 hit, "Take It From Me". The group also became recognised for its fashion sense, with their flower hats becoming a symbol of the band; at one point, they had their own clothing line.

After the departure of lead vocalist Robyn Loau, the group changed its name to GF4.

Career

Career beginnings and singing
Three of the members—Jacqueline Cowell, Siobhánn Heidenreich and Melanie Alexander — first met while taking dance lessons at age three. Years later, they decided to form a pop group, and through their dance teacher Janice Breen, met Noel MacDonald, a singer, songwriter and jingle producer who saw promise in them. Two more singers were added to the group – Robyn Loau, who MacDonald saw singing at Wonderland Sydney Theme Park, and Lorinda Noble, who auditioned for the group. MacDonald also put the girls in touch with Ross Wood. For two years, Wood, a former television cameraman and director, had struggled to see his own concept of an all-female pop group become a reality. During those two years he had continually presented his idea of an all-girl pop group aimed directly at the neglected younger teen market to virtually all the local record labels, but only Mushroom and BMG expressed any interest in signing them. Of course the "them" at the point Wood was pitching his idea was still a vague idea with unnamed girls. Girlfriend was his idea made flesh, something more tangible to pitch. It was no wonder things moved quickly once a line up was decided – this had been seemingly everyones dream for a long time. Singer and choreographer Kelley Abbey was also brought in to choreograph the group's dance moves. The quintet was signed to a deal with RCA Records Australia in 1991, after a year of self-promotion. The band were formed with the ambition of being both Australia and Asia's #1 girl band, with the band members, particularly Robyn Loau, undertaking extensive Japanese lessons.

1992–1993: Make It Come True and It's Up to You
In April 1992, the group released their debut single, "Take It from Me", which reached No. 1 on the ARIA chart. This was followed by "Girl's Life" (#15) and "Without You" (#18). In September 1992, Girlfriend released their debut studio album, Make It Come True which peaked at number 6 in Australia.

In April 1993, Girlfriend released Girl's Life, a Japan-exclusive album, consisting of songs from Make It Come True, mostly re-recorded with Japanese vocals.

In September 1993, Girlfriend released "Heartbeat", the lead single from their second studio album, before releasing It's Up to You in October 1993. The group's two studio albums, Make It Come True (1992) and It's Up to You (1993) were certified platinum and gold respectively in Australia.

In November, the group released a four-track Japan-only extended play titled Magic.

1994–1996: GF4
In 1994, after the group had returned from a tour of Europe and Japan, Loau left the group to start a solo career. She later enjoyed minor success with the hit "Sick with Love" which peaked at number 21 on the ARIA Charts, and released an album, Malaria.

The four remaining members renamed themselves as GF4. GF4 released two singles; the first, a cover version of the 1971 Grass Roots song "Sooner or Later", reached No. 11 on the ARIA singles charts. In 1995, Jacqui Cowell left the band and was replaced by future Bardot member, Belinda Chapple, who featured in the music video for GF4's second single, "Need Love (To Make the Sex Right)", filmed in a Sydney nightclub. The video featured band member Siobhann Heidenrich miming to Cowell's spoken lines in the opening to the song. The single narrowly missed the ARIA Top 100 singles chart, resulting in the debut album that GF4 had recorded in Los Angeles being shelved. 
GF4 did not release any further material as a band and split in 1996.

Later appearances
On 13 May 2007, the former five members of Girlfriend appeared on Channel 7's Where Are They Now? program. The five spoke about their time with Girlfriend and performed an a cappella rendition of "Take It from Me" for the live audience.

A "best-of" compilation, Essential Girlfriend, was scheduled for release in November 2010, but remains unreleased.

In November 2010, former member Melanie Alexander provided guest vocals on the song "Falling for the Dance Floor" with Australian DJ, Stonedog. The track appears on the compilation album Club Anthems Asia, released through Hong Kong-based independent dance music label Volume Up Records.

In May 2017, Robyn Loau confirmed that the original members were reuniting for the 25th anniversary of their #1 hit "Take It from Me".

Members
Robyn Loau
Melanie Alexander
Lorinda (Rindy) Noble
Siobhánn Heidenreich
Jacqueline (Jacqui) Cowell
Other

Discography

Studio albums

Compilations

Extended plays

Singles

Awards

ARIA Music Awards
The ARIA Music Awards is an annual awards ceremony that recognises excellence, innovation, and achievement across all genres of Australian music. Girlfriend received three nominations.

|-
| rowspan="2"| 1993
| rowspan="1"| Make It Come True
| Best New Talent
| 
|-
| rowspan="1"| "Take It from Me"
| Highest Selling Single
| 
|-
| rowspan="1"| 1994
| rowspan="1"| It's Up to You
| Best Pop Release
| 
|-

See also
List of artists who reached number one on the Australian singles chart

References

External links 

Australian electronic dance music groups
Australian girl groups
Australian pop music groups
Musical groups established in 1991
Musical groups disestablished in 1996
1991 establishments in Australia